James Ajongo Mawut (1 January 1961 – 20 April 2018) Was the Chief and top General of the South Sudanese Military, the South Sudanese Peoples Defence Force, (SSPDF). He was appointed on 9 May 2017 and took-over the office on 10 May 2017 after he was sworn in by the President Salva Kiir Mayardit in the presidential palace. He was an Aweilian. His native land was Barmayen, which indicates that he was from the Luo people. Current deputy governor of Aweil Uber Mawut is his biological brother.

Military service

James Ajongo Mawut joined the SPLA in 1983.

References

1961 births
2018 deaths
South Sudanese politicians
South Sudanese military personnel
People from Northern Bahr el Ghazal
Luo people
People of the South Sudanese Civil War